Mabel Fuller Blodgett (1869 – 1959) was a novelist and writer of children's books.

Biography
Born on April 10, 1869, as Mabel Louise Fuller in Bangor, Maine, she was the daughter of Mr. and Mrs. Ransom B. Fuller. Her father became the president of two insurance companies in Boston. She graduated from the Sacred Heart Convent at Elmhurst in Providence, Rhode Island, and wrote her first novel At the Queen’s Mercy (1897) at the age of 19.  Her subsequent works include:

 The Aspen Shade: A Romance (1889)
 Fairy Tales with illustrations by Ethel Reed (Boston, 1896)
 A Mother's Prayer (1900)
 The Giant's Ruby and Other Fairy Tales (1903)
 When Christmas Came Too Early (1912)
 The Strange Story of Mr. Dog and Mr. Bear (1915)
 Peasblossom: The Adventures of the Pine Tree Fairy and Others (1917)
 The Magic Slippers (1917)

She also published a non-fiction work, The Life and Letters of Richard Ashley Blodgett, First Lieutenant United States Air Service in 1919. Richard Blodgett was her son, and he was killed in action during World War I (1918).

Blodgett was living with her husband, attorney Edward E. Blodgett, in Brookline, Massachusetts by 1897, when Richard was born. She is buried in Mount Auburn Cemetery in Cambridge, Massachusetts.

References

External links

 

1869 births
1959 deaths
19th-century American novelists
20th-century American novelists
American women novelists
Writers from Bangor, Maine
People from Brookline, Massachusetts
Writers from Providence, Rhode Island
Novelists from Massachusetts
20th-century American women writers
19th-century American women writers
Novelists from Maine